Alfredrick Hughes (born July 19, 1962) is a retired American professional basketball player who was selected by the San Antonio Spurs in the first round (14th pick overall) in the 1985 NBA draft.

Loyola career
After graduating from Chicago's Robeson High School, Hughes played college basketball at Loyola Chicago, where the 6'5" (1.96 m) shooting guard averaged 17.0 points per game as a freshman, 25.7 as a sophomore, 27.6 as a junior, and 26.3 as a senior. Hughes is Loyola's all-time leading scorer with 2,914 points, ranking ninth on the NCAA career scoring list. Hughes also ended his college career as the all-time scoring leader in the Midwestern Collegiate Conference, now known as the Horizon League, holding this record until Detroit Mercy's Antoine Davis—who had the benefit of a fifth year of athletic eligibility due to COVID-19 disruptions—broke it in December 2022. He also holds the school record for most points scored in a game with 47 against Detroit (now Detroit Mercy) on February 5, 1985. Hughes was an All-American in 1985 and was a three-time Midwestern Collegiate Conference Player of the Year. His #21 is retired at Loyola.

NBA career
Hughes played in only one NBA season. He played for the Spurs during the 1985–86 NBA season, appearing in 68 games and averaging 5.2 ppg.

References

External links
Alfredrick Hughes NBA statistics, basketballreference.com
Italian League statistics

1962 births
Living people
All-American college men's basketball players
American expatriate basketball people in Canada
American expatriate basketball people in Greece
American expatriate basketball people in Italy
American expatriate basketball people in the Philippines
American men's basketball players
Basketball players from Chicago
Fabriano Basket players
Fort Wayne Fury players
Grand Rapids Hoops players
Iraklis Thessaloniki B.C. players
Hartford Hellcats players
Loyola Ramblers men's basketball players
Philippine Basketball Association imports
Pop Cola Panthers players
Quad City Thunder players
Rochester Renegade players
San Antonio Spurs draft picks
San Antonio Spurs players
Shooting guards